Volkers is a surname. Notable people with the surname include:

Wim Volkers (1899–1990), Dutch football player and coach

See also
Volker (name)

Surnames from given names